The Interception of Communications Act 1985 (1985 c. 56) was an Act of Parliament in the United Kingdom. It came into operation as of 10 April 1986.

The Act created the offence of unlawfully intercepting communications sent by post or by a "public telecommunications system"; those guilty were liable, on conviction, to a fine or up to two years imprisonment. It provided for a system of warrants to permit legal interception, and laid down cases where interception could be done lawfully, stating that having reasonable grounds to believe that the other party consented to interception was a defence.

The Act also established a complaints tribunal (which in 2000 was subsumed into the Investigatory Powers Tribunal), and created the post of Interception of Communications Commissioner to review the workings of the Act. It amended parts of the Telecommunications Act 1984.

This Act has since been repealed by schedule 1 of the Regulation of Investigatory Powers Act 2000.

See also
 Secrecy of correspondence
Malone v UK
United Kingdom constitutional law

References
 Whitaker's Almanack: for the year 1987, complete edition, p. 363. J. Whitaker & Sons, London, 1986
 Sections of the Interception of Communications Act 1985 as passed

United Kingdom Acts of Parliament 1985
Telecommunications in the United Kingdom